The Snares snipe (Coenocorypha huegeli), also known as the Snares Island snipe, or tutukiwi in Māori, is a species of bird in the sandpiper family, Scolopacidae.

Taxonomy and etymology
The Snares Island snipe is one of a group of birds of sometimes disputed relationships in the genus Coenocorypha. It was formerly considered to be a subspecies of the Subantarctic snipe (Coenocorypha aucklandica), but has since been elevated to a full species.

The taxon was first described by the Reverend Henry Baker Tristram as Gallinago huegeli, with the specific epithet honouring British and Austrian naturalist Anatole von Hügel who collected it. The Māori name, “tutukiwi”, which may be applied to other Coenocorypha snipes as well, alludes to the bird's fancied resemblance in appearance and behaviour to a miniature kiwi.

Description
The snipe is a small, chunky and cryptically patterned wader with bars, stripes and spots in shades of brown ranging from buffy-white to nearly black, with longitudinal stripes on the face and crown. It has a long bill, with a short neck and tail.  The outer tail feathers are narrow and stiffened, a modification to produce the distinctive roaring sound of the nocturnal “hakawai” aerial display.

The sexes of the snipe are similar in appearance, though females are slightly larger than the males with weights of about 116 g compared with the males’ 101g, and with bills around 57 mm in length compared with 55 mm.  Compared with males, the females have olive rather than yellow coloured legs, and with mottling on the inner edges of the primary coverts rather than having no such markings.  The males also have more strongly contrasting dorsal markings.  Juveniles are duller in colouration.  In sexing the snipe, researchers on the Snares have found that, although no single character is diagnostic, in combination they allow most birds to be assigned to age and sex classes.  Walter Oliver, in his New Zealand Birds (1955), says “The Snares Island snipe is distinguished by the under surface being barred all over which is not the case with any other subspecies.  The general colour also is more reddish than in the others.”

Distribution and habitat
The snipe is endemic to the Snares Islands, a small subantarctic island group, with a total surface area of 3.5 km 2, some 200 km south of New Zealand in the Southern Ocean.  There it breeds on North East and Broughton Islands, and has been recorded on Alert Stack.  The species has also been introduced to Putauhinu Island.  Its favoured habitat is the moist floor beneath Olearia and Brachyglottis forest, with a ground layer of grass tussocks, sedges, mat-forming herbs and Polystichum vestitum shield ferns.

Behaviour
Edgar Stead reported on a visit to the Snares in December 1947 by saying of the snipe:
"When flushed in the daytime it runs for a few feet then stands still silently regarding the intruder. They are reluctant to fly during the daytime and when they do it is not for more than ten or fifteen yards and often for only two or three. At night they fly more readily and for considerable distances. Their food apparently consists chiefly of worms.  Always snipe are to be found on the outskirts of penguin colonies. Their laying season commenced at the beginning of December. Nests were found in the heart of big tussocks of Poa foliosa about one foot above ground level.  The nests were deep cups of fine grass 9 ½ cm wide by 7 cm deep, and contained a good deal of material."

Breeding
Most of the snipe breed in monogamous pairs, which hold breeding territories, with both parents sharing incubation duties of the two-egg clutch, in a nest concealed in dense ground vegetation.  When the chicks hatch they weigh 14-18 g and are precocial and nidifugous; the male parent looks after the first chick to leave the nest, while the female takes care of the second.  The chicks remain with their respective parents for about eight weeks, and are fed by them for the first two.  They are capable of flight at about 30 days old.

Feeding
The snipe feed on a variety of small invertebrates, including annelids, amphipods, spiders and insects, obtained by probing with their long bills in the soil and leaf litter.

Status and conservation
The total population of the species in the Snares is estimated at just over 400 pairs.  On 16 April 2005 thirty snipe were translocated from North East Island in the Snares to  Putauhinu Island, in order to establish an insurance population against the possibility of the Snares being threatened by the accidental introduction of terrestrial predators. Putauhinu lies in the south-western chain of the Titi Islands, near Stewart Island.  It lies 1.5 km west of Big South Cape Island, which was the final refuge for the now extinct South Island snipe (Coenocorypha iredalei).

References

External links
 Snares snipe video from Te Ara - the Encyclopedia of New Zealand (Flash required)

Snares Island snipe
Snares Islands / Tini Heke
Endemic birds of New Zealand
Snares Island snipe
Taxa named by Henry Baker Tristram